Grevillea decipiens is a species of flowering plant in the family Proteaceae and is endemic to the south of Western Australia. It is a dense, compact shrub with erect branches, linear leaves and small groups of red flowers with a pale orange to red style.

Description

Taxonomy
Grevillea decipiens was first formally described in 1986 by Donald McGillivray in his book New names in Grevillea (Proteaceae) from specimens collected by Alex George in 1969. The specific epithet (decipiens) means "deceiving" , referring to this species' similarity to Grevillea oligantha.

Distribution and habitat
This grevillea grows in shrubland and mallee woodland between Ongerup and Frank Hann National Park in the Esperance Plains and Mallee biogeographic regions of southern Western Australia.

Conservation status
Grevillea decipiens is listed as "not threatened" by the Western Australian Government Department of Parks and Wildlife.

References

decipiens
Proteales of Australia
Flora of Western Australia
Taxa named by Donald McGillivray
Plants described in 1986